Laura Hughes Lunde (1886–1966)  was a Canadian feminist, socialist and pacifist. She was an outspoken pacifist in Toronto during World War I (1914–18). Towards the end of the war she married and moved to Chicago, where she was active in numerous civic causes for the rest of her life, notably fighting for women's rights and for improvements to education.

Family

Laura Hughes was born in Toronto, Canada in 1886.
She was the daughter of James Laughlin Hughes and Adaline Marean Hughes, two well known educators and reformers in Toronto.
Her father was chief inspector of the schools in Toronto and her mother was the first kindergarten teacher in Toronto.
James Hughes supported the temperance movement, opposed corporal punishment in schools and was a strong believer in hygiene.
He passionately supported the British Empire, and launched the cadet movement in Canadian public schools.
Her uncle was Sir Sam Hughes, Minister of Militia during World War I.

As a young woman Laura Hughes worked in a mill, and then published a paper that described the abusive working conditions she had found.
Based on her experience, she campaigned for reforms to labor laws.
She co-founded the Canadian Labour Party.

World War I

Laura Hughes was active in the pacifist movement during World War I.
Her uncle Sir Sam Hughes "offered her a half section of prairie land if she would give up her interest in peace work." She refused.
She attended the Women's Peace Conference at The Hague in 1915.
At this meeting the International Committee of Women for Permanent Peace was established, with the American Jane Addams as president. Many Canadian women declined to attend, finding that their loyalty to the Empire was stronger than their attachment to pacifism.
The press accused women who did attend of having "fallen under the influence of the German plotters at the alleged peace conference.

After returning from Europe, Hughes and other feminists joined with the Toronto Suffrage Association and the Women's Social-Democratic League to establish the Canadian Women's Peace Party (WPP).
Co-founders of the WPP were Elsie Charlton and Alice Amelia Chown.
The WPP was affiliated with the Women's International League for Peace and Freedom (WILPF).
Hughes was an organizer for the Canadian branch of the WILPF.
In late October 1916 she wrote that the Canadian branch of the ICWPP was active in every province of Canada apart from British Columbia.
Hughes was unusual in claiming that the drive for profits was keeping the war alive.
Unlike other pacifist women, she seems to have avoided using maternal feminist arguments.
Hughes wrote pessimistically in 1916,

Hughes became associated with the Independent Labour Party (ILP).
Hughes spoke publicly against conscription into the armed forces when this became an issue in 1917,
and was praised for her stance by the SDPC.
Many feminists were opposed to pacifism. Woman's Century responded in late summer 1917 to a report that Hughes and Harriet Dunlop Prenter, described as "prominent suffragists", had drawn a link between suffrage and pacifism in Ontario.
According to the editor, Jessie Campbell MacIver, "National Union and Ontario Equal Franchise Association have again and again expressed themselves as repudiating utterly any question of premature peace. Any pacifist literature which has been received from the Hague and elsewhere has been consigned by these societies to the waste-paper basket."
Hughes and Prenter seem to have been engaged in a struggle to lead the women's pacifists in Toronto.

Chicago

In December 1917 Laura Hughes married Erling Lunde of Chicago, a conscientious objector, and moved to Chicago.
By November 1918 she was a new mother.
She was to have two sons, Chester and Leif.
Hughes' husband was imprisoned for his stance until the fall of 1920. 
Laura worked to support conscientious objectors in 1918–20, assisted by her father-in-law.

Laura Lunde spent much time teaching women about their rights and responsibilities as citizens.
She also set herself the task of "chasing good government."
She and Jane Addams became close friends.
Lunde campaigned for laws to regulate child labor, job security for teachers, state assistance for education and electoral reforms.
Laura became educational chairman of the Illinois League of Women Voters.
She took an active role in the City Club of Chicago.
She chaired state committees such as the Joint Committee on Voting Machines and the Illinois Committee for Eradication of Tuberculosis.

In 1939 women gained the right to serve on juries in Illinois. Lunde was the first female foreman of a Federal Grand Jury in the state.
She was a member of the "Big 19" in the early 1950s, a lobby group that pushed local government to fight organized crime.
She became president of the Civil Service Reform Association. She was involved in organizations such as the Joint Committee on School Affairs, Cook County Health District, Illinois Conference on Legislation, Illinois Civic Exchange and the Illinois State Library.

Laura Hughes Lunde died in 1966.
The Ebinger School in Edison Park, Chicago dedicated its Learning Resource Room to her.
The Chicago Daily News wrote that "by almost any standard of judgment Mrs. Laura Hughes Lunde ranked as one of Chicago's most useful citizens."

See also
List of peace activists

Publications

 Reports, pamphlets, memos, correspondence, and newsletters that pertain to the Citizens of Greater Chicago, the National Civic Review, the Illinois Conference on Legislation and the Committee for Modern Courts in Illinois.

References

Sources

1886 births
1966 deaths
Canadian feminists
Canadian socialists
Canadian pacifists
Canadian socialist feminists
Canadian emigrants to the United States